MRVC  may refer to:

 MRV Communications
 Mumbai Rail Vikas Corporation